The Arkham Evil is a 1983 role-playing game adventure for Call of Cthulhu published by Theatre of the Mind Enterprises.

Contents
The Arkham Evil consists of three separate but interconnected scenarios involving the same group of player characters.

Reception
William A. Barton reviewed The Arkham Evil in Space Gamer No. 64. Barton commented that "though not as well conceived or executed as Chaosium's own recent Shadows of Yog-Sothoth scenario book, The Arkham Evil, in the hands of a competent (fiendish?) Keeper, should provide several sanity-threatening sessions into the world of the Cthulhu Mythos for the unwary player-character."

Jon Sutherland reviewed The Arkham Evil for White Dwarf #48, giving it an overall rating of 7 out of 10, and stated that "Arkham did not really live up to the expectations or the quality it promised in the first part of the adventure."

Richard Lee reviewed The Arkham Evil for Imagine magazine, and stated that "the plot was intriguing, but out of control. Druidic rituals, terrorist miners, fated asteroids end unlikely German barons just don't tie together. Result? Contrivance on a massive scale. The players are bundled from scene to scene like puppets, reeling as unexplained 'happenings' bombard them from every side... A pity, since many scenes were potentially quite interesting."

Reviews
 Different Worlds #31 (Nov., 1983)
 Space Gamer #64 (July, 1983)
 Reviews from R’lyeh, September 2017.
Jeux & Stratégie #33 (as "Terreur sur Arkham")

References

Call of Cthulhu (role-playing game) adventures
Role-playing game supplements introduced in 1983